You Too Brutus is a 2015 Malayalam comedy film scripted and directed by Roopesh Peethambaran with dialogues co-written by Mathukutty and Roopesh Peethambaran, the Hindi dialogues were written by Sony Chandy. The film is produced by Sheikh Afsal under the banner of Round Up Cinema. It features an ensemble cast including Asif Ali, Sreenivasan, Tovino Thomas, Honey Rose, Anu Mohan, Delna Davis, Rachana Narayanankutty, Ahmed Sidhique and Ena Saha. The film was released on 20 March 2015 and became average grosser at kerala box office.

Plot
Story revolves around the paradoxical elements of love and betrayal which leads to bizarre endings. The film is filled with sub-plots and ends with the beginning of possible sub-plots. Hari is the house owner who shelters Arun, Tovino, and Vicky. Hari is a well-known painter and is in love with Muktha. Abhi is Hari's brother and is also friends with Vicky. Vicky leads a playboy life with a live-in girlfriend, Tina, who is a promiscuous person that cheats on him with another guy for a stable relationship. Abhi leads a married life with Aparna but also engages in an extramarital relation with Shirly, he runs a music studio. Tovino is a gym trainer who cajoles older women's for gifts and such and also an aspiring playboy. Arun is a company employee who leads a love-life with an under-age girl Diya, who herself have ulterior motives. His immature judgements makes his life troublesome. Unni is the help of Hari who cooks food and helps in other household matters, he also aspires to be like Vicky and Tovino, as a skilled womanizer. The story weaves in and out these characters with tight and loosened grip of drama and humor.

Cast

 Sreenivasan as Hari
 Asif Ali as Abhi
 Tovino Thomas as Tovino
 Honey Rose as Shirly
 Rachana Narayanankutty as Aparna
 Ahmed Sidhique as Arun
 Ena Saha as Diya
 Muktha as Dance Teacher
 Anu Mohan as Vicky
 Delna Davis as Tina
 Suddhy Koppa as Unni
 Rony David as Music director
 Molly Kannamaly as Aunty
 Gokulan as Urumis
 Remadevi as Gym Aunty
 Deepak Parambol as Hero at the hospital (cameo)

Release
The film was released on 20 March 2015 in 70 screens across kerala.

Critical reception
Sify wrote that the film was inspired by Latin American movie styles. The Times of India gave the film 3 stars out of 5, identifying the film as targeting a young and urban audience. Indiaglitz.com agreed about the target audience and called the film "shallow and desperate". Rediff gave the film 2 stars out of 5 and wrote, "The message from You Too Brutus is that human relationships are fragile but the way it is conveyed leaves us with a bad taste in the mouth".

Rights
The satellite rights of the movie bagged by Surya TV.

References

External links
 

2015 films
2010s Malayalam-language films